These are the Official Charts Company's UK Independent Singles Chart number-one singles of 2018.

Chart history

Notes
 – The single was simultaneously number-one on the singles chart.
"Kika" was not a single but the official charts still allowed it on the chart.

Number-one Indie artists

See also
List of UK Dance Singles Chart number ones of 2018
List of UK R&B Singles Chart number ones of 2018
List of UK Rock & Metal Singles Chart number ones of 2018
List of UK Independent Albums Chart number ones of 2018

References

External links
Indie Singles Top 40 at the Official Charts Company
UK Top 30 Indie Singles Chart at BBC Radio 1

2018 in British music
United Kingdom Indie Singles
Indie 2018